Ciarán Ó Cofaigh is an Irish film director and producer.

Biography
A native of Ráth Cairn, County Meath, but now resident in Indreabhán, County Galway, Ó Cofaigh has worked in the Irish film and broadcast industry for almost thirty years, and is co-founder and managing director of ROSG. He began by enrolling on a producer/director course established by Údarás na Gaeltachta and RTÉ. Following this he worked freelance on productions for RTÉ and BBC NI.

Ciarán is an experienced producer/director/animator, both in film and television. Amongst his award-winning productions are the feature film Cré na Cille (Graveyard Clay); the supernatural thriller series, Na Cloigne (The Heads), the animate series Scéal na Gaeilge (The Story of the Irish Language/Gaelic),the thriller series An Bronntanas (The Gift) and the docu-drama feature Murdair Mhám Trasna (The Mám Trasna Murders). Ciarán is currently in production on the feature docu-drama, Avenger Ghaoth Dobhair (Gaoth Dobhair Avenger).

He co-founded ROSG (Old Irish rosg, meaning eye) in 1998, a film and television company based in An Spidéal. ROSG has since produced a wide variety of films, drama, documentaries and even animations, winning national and international awards for their work. 

He also co-founded and produced the Siol Scéal initiative of short films, a development scheme established by ROSG and Eo Teilifís to promote new talented writers and directors. From this scheme 24 half-hour short films have been produced and broadcast to date.

Ciarán has also tutored in Television and Broadcasting in University College Galway.

Ó Cofaigh produced an adaptation of the novel Cré na Cille, by Máirtín Ó Cadhain, starring Bríd Ní Neachtain. It was viewed at a number of Irish and global film festivals such as the Shanghai International Film Festival.

See also
 Ó Cobhthaigh

References

External links
 https://web.archive.org/web/20110122191232/http://www.galwayindependent.com/profiles/profiles/ciaran-o-cofaigh-%11-producer%10director/
 
 http://www.filmireland.net/tag/ciaran-o-cofaigh/
 http://www.rosg.ie/en/news/Oireachtas_Communication_Awards__14
 https://web.archive.org/web/20110727090104/http://www.theirishworld.com/article.asp?SubSection_Id=10&Article_Id=18021
 http://rosg.ie/en/productions/An_Bronntanas_16
 https://www.irishtimes.com/news/ireland/irish-news/omission-of-fadas-from-irish-names-by-public-bodies-investigated-1.3780757

Living people
20th-century Irish people
21st-century Irish people
Irish film directors
Irish producers
People from County Meath
People from County Galway
People educated at Coláiste Eoin
Year of birth missing (living people)